Grammatonotus brianne, the Batangas groppo, is a deep water fish of the family Callanthiidae. It inhabits high complexity habitats at depths in excess of 140m, and was described based on specimens collected in the Batangas region of the Philippines.  It holds the record as being the deepest species of fish described based on specimens collected by divers, all of the fishes described based on specimens caught deeper than 150m were collected by hook and line, traps, trawls, submarines, or other indirect methods. It was named in honor of Brianne Atwood.

References 

Fish described in 2016
Callanthiidae
Fish of the Philippines
Taxa named by Luiz A. Rocha